The Scout and Guide movement in Guinea-Bissau is served by
 Escuteiros da Guiné-Bissau, member of the World Organization of the Scout Movement; originating from a merger of Corpo Nacional de Escutas da Guiné-Bissau and Organização dos Escuteiros da Guiné-Bissau in 2016
Federacao Dos Escoteiros Tradicionais - FET, member World Organization of Independent Scouts

See also

References